Koshanpye, also called Kopyidoung, is a historical name in Burmese literature which means "nine Shan states". The name was first introduced to western readers by Francis Buchanan-Hamilton in the Edinburgh Philosophical Journal, X, year of 1824.

Discovery and explanation

Francis Buchanan-Hamilton obtained the Map of Koshanpri from the slave in Ava. Hamilton didn't research the proper name of "Koshanpri" or the literal meaning "Nine Provinces of Shan", but he pointed out that the Shan territory had been divided into 18 lordships, the slave even alleged that this number had been increased to 22. After that, many scholars have given conflicting lists of "nine Shan states" strove to explain the name.

Some of the scholars don't agree with the literal meaning of "nine Shan states". James George Scott believe "Koshanpye" was transformed from "Kawsampi", it is because Mong Mao and Hsenwi use the name "Kawsampi" as their Buddhistical name, the Burman official didn't admit that a Shan kingdom had any right to a classical name. But the Shan scholar Sao Saimong opposes this opinion, he states that Koshanpyi is never mistaken for Kawsampi, Burman central court respected Shan states use their own classical name, Koshanpyi is referred to Chinese Shan states.

References

Shan States
History of Shan State
History of Yunnan